Mageri Point is a peninsula, located in Morobe Province, Papua New Guinea.

References

Morobe Province